Ace of Spades (Japanese: エース・オブ・スペーズ, stylized as ACE OF SPADES) is a Japanese rock band managed by LDH since 2012 and signed to the record label Rhythm Zone. The band started being formed in 2005 while Exile and Glay released the collaboration single "Scream". The project was formed between Hiro and Glay members Hisashi and Takuro.

History

2012: Band formation and debut 
In 2012, it was announced that a band project between Exile and Glay had been formed. The members of this band were established musicians from different backgrounds, such as Takahiro from Exile, Hisashi from Glay, Tokie and Motokatsu Miyagami. On August 22 of the same year, Ace of Spades debuted with the single "Wild Tribe".

2013-2018: Hiatus and High&Low soundtrack 
After their debut the band were on hiatus until 2016, when they took part in the soundtrack for the movie High&Low and its sequel High&Low: The Red Rain. For these occasions the band released the song "Sin" featuring Hiroomi Tosaka on June 15, 2016, and the single "Time Flies" together with PKCZ® and Hiroomi Tosaka, on October 12, 2016.

2019: First studio album and tour 
On February 20, 2019, the band released their first studio album "4Real" with the title track "Vampire". They went on their first national tour Ace of Spades 1st. Tour 2019 “4Real” from February 26 until March 23 in the same year.

Members

Discography

Studio albums

Singles

References

External links 

2012 establishments in Japan
Japanese rock music groups
Musical groups established in 2012
LDH (company) artists